Áed mac Boanta (died 839) is believed to have been a king of Dál Riata.

The only reference to Áed in the Irish annals is found in the Annals of Ulster, where it is recorded that "Eóganán mac Óengusa, Bran mac Óengusa, Áed mac Boanta, and others almost innumerable" were in a battle fought by the men of Fortriu against Vikings in 839.

The Duan Albanach lists an "Áed An" who ruled for four years over Dál Riata and the Synchronisms of Flann Mainistrech place him between Caustantín mac Fergusa and Eóganán mac Óengusa, Caustantín's nephew. It is doubtful whether Caustantín and Eóganán ruled over Dál Riata, but Áed is thought to have done so.

Áed may have been preceded as king by Domnall mac Caustantín. It is not known what kings followed him, if any, before the region fell under the dominance of Norse-Gaels such as the Uí Ímair in the latter part of the ninth century.

References

 Anderson, Alan Orr, Early Sources of Scottish History A.D 500–1286, volume 1. Reprinted with corrections. Paul Watkins, Stamford, 1990. 
 Bannerman, John, "The Scottish Takeover of Pictland" in Dauvit Broun & Thomas Owen Clancy (eds.) Spes Scotorum: Hope of Scots. Saint Columba, Iona and Scotland. T & T Clark, Edinburgh, 1999. 
 Broun, Dauvit, "Pictish Kings 761–839: Integration with Dál Riata or Separate Development" in Sally M. Foster (ed.), The St Andrews Sarcophagus: A Pictish masterpiece and its international connections. Four Courts, Dublin, 1998. 

839 deaths
Kings of Dál Riata
9th-century Irish monarchs
9th-century Scottish monarchs
Monarchs killed in action
Year of birth unknown